Poems of the Past and the Present is the second collection of poems by English poet Thomas Hardy, and was published in 1901.  A wide-ranging collection, divided into five headings, it contains some of Hardy's most powerful and lasting poetic contributions.

Reception and thematics
The unusually favourable reception of the collection was due in large part to its opening with the section of 'War Poems', many previously published independently, and welcomed by the public for their treatment of the Boer War — the seminal Drummer Hodge being the outstanding example.

Hardy's friend Sir George Douglas called some of the collection's poems Aeschylean, and Hardy himself considered that the 'Doom' themes in the work overlapped with those in The Dynasts. However, he had been careful in the collection's Preface to disclaim any organised philosophy therein, adding that "Unadjusted impressions have their value..."

Notable pieces
Among other notable pieces were his poem 'Well-beloved', on the transient succession of a man's love-ideal; and "The Darkling Thrush", the humorous piece "The Ruined Maid", and the dour sequence "In Tenebris".

See also
Heinrich Heine
Rupert Brooke
War poetry

References

External links 
 Poems of the Past and the Present (1901) at Archive.org
 Poems of the Past and the Present (1901) at Project Gutenberg

1901 poetry books
English poetry collections
Poetry by Thomas Hardy